Ronald Musengi is a career banker and civil servant in Kenya, formerly a commissioner of the National Police Service Commission. He is widely known for institutional police reforms in Kenya including rigorous police lifestyle audits and development of numerous policy frameworks for the police service at a time when the National Police in Kenya was widely ridiculed for extensive corruption.

References

Living people
Year of birth missing (living people)
Kenyan civil servants